The 2003 United States Open Championship was the 103rd U.S. Open, held June 12–15 at the North Course of Olympia Fields Country Club in Olympia Fields, Illinois, a suburb south of Chicago. Jim Furyk won his only major championship, three shots ahead of runner-up Stephen Leaney. With a total score of 272, Furyk tied the record for the lowest 72-hole score in U.S. Open history, also achieved in 2000, 1993 and 1980 (and since lowered to 268 in 2011).  Another record was equalled by Vijay Singh, who tied Neal Lancaster's 9-hole record of 29 on the back nine of his second round.

This was the fourth major held at Olympia Fields; it hosted the U.S. Open in 1928 and the PGA Championship in 1925 and 1961.

Course

North Course 

Source:

Field
1. Last 10 U.S. Open Champions
Ernie Els (4,9,10,12,16), Retief Goosen (9,10,16), Lee Janzen, Corey Pavin, Tiger Woods (3,4,5,8,9,12,16)
Steve Jones did not play due to an injury.

2. Top two finishers in the 2002 U.S. Amateur
Ricky Barnes (a), Hunter Mahan (a)

3. Last five Masters Champions
José María Olazábal (9,10), Vijay Singh (5,9,11,12,16), Mike Weir (12,16)

4. Last five British Open Champions
David Duval, Paul Lawrie (10,16), Mark O'Meara

5. Last five PGA Champions
Rich Beem (9,12,16), David Toms (9,16)

6. The Players Champion
Davis Love III (9,16)

7. The U.S. Senior Open Champion
Don Pooley

8. Top 15 finishers and ties in the 2002 U.S. Open
Robert Allenby (9,16), Tom Byrum, Nick Faldo, Sergio García (9,10,16), Jay Haas (16), Pádraig Harrington (10,16), Dudley Hart, Scott Hoch (16), Justin Leonard (9,16), Peter Lonard (15,16), Jeff Maggert, Billy Mayfair, Phil Mickelson (9,16), Nick Price (9,16)

9. Top 30 leaders on the 2002 PGA Tour official money list
K. J. Choi (16), Chris DiMarco (16), Bob Estes (16), Fred Funk (16), Jim Furyk (16), Charles Howell III (16), Jerry Kelly (16), Steve Lowery, Scott McCarron, Shigeki Maruyama (16), Len Mattiace (16), Rocco Mediate (16), Kenny Perry (16), Chris Riley (16), Loren Roberts, John Rollins, Jeff Sluman (16)

10. Top 15 on the 2002 European Tour Order of Merit
Thomas Bjørn (16), Ángel Cabrera (16), Michael Campbell (16), Trevor Immelman (16), Stephen Leaney, Colin Montgomerie (16), Eduardo Romero (16), Justin Rose (16), Adam Scott (16)

11. Top 10 on the PGA Tour official money list, as of May 25

12. Winners of multiple PGA Tour events from April 24, 2002 through the 2003 Memorial Tournament

13. Top 2 from the 2003 European Tour Order of Merit, as of May 26

14. Top 2 on the 2002 Japan Golf Tour, provided they are within the top 75 point leaders of the Official World Golf Rankings at that time
Toru Taniguchi

15. Top 2 on the 2002 PGA Tour of Australasia, provided they are within the top 75 point leaders of the Official World Golf Rankings at that time
Craig Parry (16)

16. Top 50 on the Official World Golf Rankings list, as of May 26
Stuart Appleby, Paul Casey, Darren Clarke, Fred Couples, Niclas Fasth, Brad Faxon, Steve Flesch, Bernhard Langer, Kirk Triplett, Scott Verplank

17. Special exemptions selected by the USGA
Hale Irwin, Tom Kite, Tom Watson

Sectional qualifiers
Tarzana, California: Anthony Arvidson (L), Bill Lunde (L), Rick Reinsberg (a,L), Warren Schutte (L)
Littleton, Colorado: Tom Glissmeyer (a,L), Bret Guetz (L)
Orlando, Florida: Doug Dunakey (L), Maarten Lafeber, Alan Morin (L), Matt Seppanen (L), Grant Waite
Roswell, Georgia: Billy Andrade, Luke List (a,L)
Glenview, Illinois: Brian Davis, Tom Gillis, Jason Knutzon (L), Bryce Molder (L)
Chevy Chase, Maryland: Chris Anderson (L), Sean Murphy (L), Dicky Pride (L)
Rockville, Maryland: Tommy Armour III, Woody Austin, Jay Don Blake, Craig Bowden, Olin Browne, Bob Burns, Jonathan Byrd, Alex Čejka, Robert Damron, Marco Dawson, Ryan Dillon (L), Joe Durant, Dan Forsman, Brian Gay, Bill Haas (a), Brian Henninger, Brandt Jobe, Richard S. Johnson, Kent Jones, Cliff Kresge, Doug LaBelle II (L), Neal Lancaster, Ian Leggatt, Spike McRoy, Larry Mize, Rod Pampling, Brett Quigley, Chez Reavie (a), Joey Sindelar, Darron Stiles, Hidemichi Tanaka, Roland Thatcher, Jay Williamson, Mark Wurtz (L)
Kansas City, Missouri: Steve Gotsche (L)
Purchase, New York: Cortney Brisson (L), Freddie Jacobson, John Maginnes, Geoffrey Sisk (L)
Cleveland, Ohio: Chad Campbell
Columbus, Ohio: Rob Bradley (L), Mark Calcavecchia, Stewart Cink, Tim Clark, Brad Elder, J. P. Hayes, J. B. Holmes (a,L), Jonathan Kaye, Hiroshi Matsuo (L), Sean McCarty (L), Joe Ogilvie, Geoff Ogilvy, Jesper Parnevik, Tim Petrovic, Rory Sabbatini, David Smail, Chris Smith, Kevin Sutherland, Bob Tway, Dean Wilson
McKinney, Texas: Greg Hiller, Trip Kuehne (a)
Auburn, Washington: Chris Baryla (a,L)

Alternates who gained entry
Roy Biancalana (L, Kansas City) – replaced Steve Jones

(a) denotes amateur
(L) denotes player advanced through local qualifying

Past champions in the field

Made the cut

Missed the cut 

In his last U.S. Open appearance, three-time champion Hale Irwin withdrew mid-round on Thursday with back spasms.

Round summaries

First round
Thursday, June 12, 2003

Second round
Friday, June 13, 2003

Amateurs: Kuehne (+1), Barnes (+2), Holmes (+5), Baryla (+6), Mahan (+6), Haas (+9), List (+9), Reinsberg (+12), Reavie (+13), Glissmeyer (+19).

Third round
Saturday, June 14, 2003

Final round
Sunday, June 15, 2003

Amateurs: Trip Kuehne (+10), Ricky Barnes (+11)

Scorecard
Final round

Cumulative tournament scores, relative to par
Source:

References

External links
2003 U.S. Open site
USOpen.com – 2003
BBC Sport golf page

U.S. Open (golf)
Golf in Illinois
U.S. Open
U.S. Open (golf)
U.S. Open (golf)
U.S. Open (golf)